In June 2016, Ireland played a three test series against South Africa as part of the 2016 mid-year rugby union tests. It was the first time that Ireland had played a test series against South Africa in South Africa since 2004. They played the Springboks across the three weeks that the June International window is allocated to; 11 June–25 June. The series was part of the fourth year of the global rugby calendar established by the International Rugby Board, which ran through to 2019.

Fixtures

Squads
Note: Ages, caps and clubs are as per 11 June, the first test match of the tour.

Ireland
On 25 May 2016, Joe Schmidt announced his 32-man squad for Ireland's June test series against South Africa.

On 2 June, Luke Fitzgerald, Dave Kearney, Rob Kearney and Johnny Sexton were all ruled out of the tour after sustaining injuries in and after the Pro12 Grand Final. Craig Gilroy, Matt Healy, Ian Madigan and Tiernan O'Halloran were called up as their replacements.

Coaching team:
 Head coach:  Joe Schmidt
 Defence coach:  Andy Farrell
 Forwards coach:  Simon Easterby

South Africa
On 28 May 2016, Allister Coetzee named his first squad since being appointed head coach. He included the following players in a 31-man squad for a three-test match series against the touring :

Pieter-Steph du Toit was initially named in the squad, but withdrew through injury and was replaced by Franco Mostert on 31 May 2016. However, on 6 June, Du Toit was given the all-clear by the medical staff and returned to training with the squad. Centre Jan Serfontein was ruled out for the entire series, but no replacement was named.

Pat Lambie was ruled out of the second test match after suffering a concussion in the first test and being given a mandatory rest period in line with World Rugby's Return to Play protocol. On 13 June 2016, Morné Steyn was called up to the squad as injury cover for Lambie.

Coaching team:
 Head coach:  Allister Coetzee
 Backs coach:  Mzwandile Stick
 Forwards coach:  Johann van Graan
 Assistant coach:  Matt Proudfoot

Matches

First Test

Notes:
 Faf de Klerk (South Africa) made his international debut.
 This was Ireland's first ever victory over South Africa in South Africa.

Second Test

Notes:
 Ruan Combrinck and Franco Mostert (both South Africa) and Sean Reidy and Quinn Roux (Ireland) made their international debuts.

Third Test

Notes:
 Steven Kitshoff, Jaco Kriel and Bongi Mbonambi (all South Africa) and Matt Healy (Ireland) made their international debuts.
 Conor Murray (Ireland) earned his 50th test cap.
 This was Eoin Reddan's last international after announcing his retirement from the professional game.

Statistics
Key
Con: Conversions
Pen: Penalties
DG: Drop goals
Pts: Points

Ireland Statistics

Test series statistics

See also
 2016 mid-year rugby union internationals
 History of rugby union matches between Ireland and South Africa

References

Ireland national rugby union team tours
Tour
Ireland tour
Rugby union tours of South Africa